An Awkward Balance, originally released as Fucking Idiots before being retitled, is a Canadian comedy film, directed by David Milchard and released in 2020. The film stars Ben Cotton and Christina Sicoli as Mike and Sara, a couple who are embarrassed by their lack of financial self-control after going on a spending spree that has left them virtually broke; they approach their friend Paul (Stephen Lobo) to administer aversion therapy in an attempt to curb their spending habits, only to be interrupted by the arrival of Venice (Sara Canning), a prostitute to whom Paul himself also owes a large unpaid debt.

The film's screenplay was written by Kris Elgstrand.

The film premiered at the 2020 Vancouver International Film Festival under the Fucking Idiots title.

References

External links

2020 films
2020 comedy films
Canadian comedy films
English-language Canadian films
Films shot in Vancouver
2020s English-language films
2020s Canadian films